Prymorske (known as Shagani before 1945) is a village in Bilhorod-Dnistrovskyi Raion, Ukraine. it belongs to Lyman rural hromada, one of the hromadas of Ukraine.

History
The village was founded by cossacks from Danubian Sich on the place of the former Tatar settlement Biyuk-Shagin

The previous name of the village was Shagani. It was renamed to its current name on 14 November 1945.

Before Soviet occupation of Bessarabia and Northern Bukovina, the village was as part of Kingdom of Romania.

Until 18 July 2020, Prymorske belonged to Tatarbunary Raion. In July 2020, as part of the administrative reform of Ukraine, which reduced the number of raions of Odesa Oblast to seven, Tatarbunary Raion was merged into Bilhorod-Dnistrovskyi Raion.

Population
Distribution of the population by native language according to the 2001 census:

References

Villages in Bilhorod-Dnistrovskyi Raion